The Apuani were one of the most formidable and powerful of the Ligurian tribes who lived in ancient north-western Italy, mentioned repeatedly by Livy. From the circumstances related by him, it appears that they were the most easterly of the Ligurian tribes, who inhabited the lofty group of mountains bordering on Etruria, and appear to have occupied the valleys of the Macra (modern Magra) and Ausar (modern Serchio). Although they extended eastwards along the chain of the Apennines to the frontiers of the Arretines and the territory of Mutina (modern Modena) and Bononia (modern Bologna), the upper valley of the Macra about Pontremoli, including the area later known as Lunigiana where the Tuscan towns of Aulla, Fivizzano, Fosdinovo, Villfranca and Pontremoli are now found, and the adjoining Upper Garfagnana and Ligurian districts of Sarzana and La Spezia were their center.

To oppose their inroads, the Romans generally made Pisae (modern Pisa) the headquarters of one of their armies, and from thence carried their arms into the heart of the mountains: but their successes seldom effected more than to compel the enemy to disperse and take refuge in their villages and mountain strongholds in which they were generally able to defy the Roman arms.

They are first mentioned in 187 BCE, when we are told that they were defeated and reduced to submission by the consul C. Flaminius; but the next year they appear again in arms, and defeated the consul Q. Marcius, with the loss of 4,000 men and three standards (plus standards of the Roman ally). The place of the battle was located by historian Lorenzo Marcuccetti, using references left by Titus Livius, in the territory of Seravezza. In fact, according to Titus Livius the places was named, after the battle, Saltus Marcius (saltus meaning a drop or a height difference and Marcius from the name of the consul) and today the hill above the supposed place of the battle, placed in a narrow gorge, still bear the name "Colle Marcio" (Marcio Hill). Others historic and logical evidences led to believe that this was the place of the battle (see Lorenzo Marcuccetti, Saltus Marcius. La sconfitta di Roma contro la Nazione Ligure-Apuana, Petrartedizioni, Lucca 2002). This disaster was avenged the next year, but after several successive campaigns the consuls for the year 181-180 BCE, P. Cornelius and M. Baebius, had recourse to the expedient of removing the whole nation from their abodes, and transporting them, to the number of 40,000, including women and children, into the heart of Samnium. Here they were settled in the vacant plains, which had formerly belonged to Taurasia (hence called Campi Taurasini), and appear to have become a flourishing community. The next year 7,000 more, who had been in the first instance suffered to remain, were removed by the consul Fulvius to join their countrymen. We meet with them long afterwards among the populi of Samnium, subsisting as a separate community, under the name of Ligures Baebiani et Corneliani, as late as the reign of Trajan.

The establishment of Roman colonies at Pisae and Luca (modern Lucca) a few years afterwards tended to consolidate the conquest thus obtained, and established the Roman dominion permanently as far as the Macra and the key Roman port of Luna (modern Luni) where a Latin colony had been established in 177 B.C. 

The existence of legendary Apua as the main village of the Apuani, is attested quite firmly since the end of the 17th century, Charles Maty identifying it with current Pontremoli. Nevertheless William Smith did not find any ancient reference to its existence.

See also
Apuan Alps

References

Ligures
Tribes conquered by Rome